Nuevo Estadio de Los Cármenes  is a multi-use stadium in Granada, Spain.  Currently, it is used mostly for football matches.  The stadium holds 19,336 people, and was built in 1995 to be the home ground of Granada CF, the main football club of the city.

History
The stadium opened on 16 May 1995.  On 6 June 1995, Real Madrid and Bayer Leverkusen contested the first match at the new stadium. Real Madrid won the match with a final score of 1:0. Peter Dubovský scored the goal.

The first official match was an under-21 contest between Spain and Armenia. The final result was 4-0, with the goals scored by Óscar, Roberto, Morales and Raúl.

Granada CF played the first match on 22 August during the celebration of the XXIII Granada Trophy when they beat Real Betis by a score of 4–1. After the promotion of Granada CF to La Liga in 2019, the stadium was renovated: there were improvements of lighting and pitch quality, aesthetic change in the stand and a new fan shop opening.

Location
This stadium is located in Zaidín, a suburb south of the city of Granada. It is very well-connected with the Circunvalación highway and with Camino de Ronda, one of the more important streets of the city. It was constructed by the side of Palacio Municipal de Deportes de Granada.

Spain
The Spain national team has played nine times in Granada (in both stadiums, Los Cármenes and Nuevo Los Cármenes), four of them were official. They are still undefeated in the city, with eight victories, the last against North Macedonia winning 4-0 in a 2018 World Cup qualifying match.

Official matches

External links
Virtual Tour
Estadios de Espana 
World Stadiums Article

References

Football venues in Andalusia
Granada CF
Buildings and structures in Granada
Sports venues completed in 1995